South Carolina Highway 308 (SC 308) is a  state highway in the U.S. state of South Carolina. The highway connects Ora and Clinton.

Route description
SC 308 begins at an intersection with U.S. Route 221 in Ora, Laurens County. It travels to the southeast and curves to the northeast. Then, it heads to the east and intersects SC 49. It crosses Duncan Creek, which leads into Clinton Reservoir. The highway passes Clinton Reservoir Tract Wildlife Management Area. After that, it crosses over Long Branch before an interchange with Interstate 385 (I-385; Veterans Memorial Highway). SC 308 crosses over Beards Fork Creek before entering Clinton. There, it meets its eastern terminus, an intersection with SC 56 Business (SC 56 Bus.) and SC 72 Bus. (North Broad Street/Willard Road).

History

Major intersections

See also

References

External links

 
 Mapmikey's South Carolina Highways Page: SC 308

308
Transportation in Laurens County, South Carolina